Edan Donald Everly (born August 25, 1968) is an American musician and singer-songwriter.

Early life
Everly is the son of Don Everly and nephew to Phil Everly  
of the Everly Brothers.

His mother is actress Venetia Stevenson. His siblings are sisters Stacy Everly and Erin Everly; he has a half sister, Venetia Everly. His maternal grandparents were the director Robert Stevenson and actress Anna Lee. His paternal grandparents were Ike and Margaret Everly.

Edan Everly is the father of one child, a daughter named Lily Edan Everly.

Career
In 1992, Everly and his band called "Edan" released an album on Hollywood Records titled Dead Flowers. In September 2006, Everly self-released his first solo album, For the Insanity of It All.  His second album, Songs from Bikini Atoll, was released in November 2011.

References

External Links
 

1968 births
Living people
People from Burbank, California
American male singer-songwriters
American people of English descent
20th-century American singers
21st-century American singers
American multi-instrumentalists
Record producers from California
20th-century American guitarists
21st-century American guitarists
Singer-songwriters from California
Guitarists from California
American male guitarists
20th-century American male singers
21st-century American male singers